Simone Palombi (born 23 April 1996) is an Italian professional footballer who plays as a forward for  club Pordenone on loan from Alessandria.

Club career
Palombi made his professional debut in the Serie B for Ternana on 1 October 2016 in a game against Verona.

He made his Serie A debut for Lazio on 20 August 2017, when he started the game against SPAL.

On 19 July 2018, Palombi signed to Lecce on loan until 30 June 2019. 

On 9 July 2019, Palombi joined to Serie B side Cremonese on loan with an option to buy.

On 24 September 2020 he moved on loan to Serie B club Pisa.

On 18 August 2021, he signed with Alessandria. On 3 August 2022, Palombi was loaned to Pordenone, with an option to buy.

International career
He made his debut with the Italy U21 team on 1 September 2017, in a friendly match against Spain.

Honours
Lazio
Supercoppa Italiana: 2017

References

External links
 

Living people
1996 births
People from Tivoli, Lazio
Association football forwards
Italian footballers
S.S. Lazio players
U.S. Lecce players
Ternana Calcio players
U.S. Salernitana 1919 players
U.S. Cremonese players
Pisa S.C. players
U.S. Alessandria Calcio 1912 players
Pordenone Calcio players
Serie A players
Serie B players
Serie C players
Italy youth international footballers
Italy under-21 international footballers
Footballers from Lazio
Sportspeople from the Metropolitan City of Rome Capital